The barred wren-warbler or southern barred warbler (Calamonastes fasciolatus) is a species of bird in the family Cisticolidae.

It is found in Namibia, Botswana, western Angola, northern South Africa and southwestern Zimbabwe.  Its natural habitat is dry savanna.

References

External links
 Barred (wren) warbler - Species text in The Atlas of Southern African Birds.

barred wren-warbler
Birds of Southern Africa
barred wren-warbler
Taxonomy articles created by Polbot